Mallavi Hospital is a government hospital in Mallavi, Sri Lanka. It is controlled by the provincial government in Jaffna. As of 2010 it had 144 beds. The hospital is sometimes called Mallavi Peripheral Unit or Mallavi District Hospital.

References

Hospitals in Mullaitivu District
Mallavi
Provincial government hospitals in Sri Lanka